European route E 422 is part of the international E-road network.

Route 
Trier — Saarbrücken
 
 E44 Trier
 E29, E50 Saarbrücken

External links 
 UN Economic Commission for Europe: Overall Map of E-road Network (2007)
 International E-road network

422
E422